Crackdown is a series of action-adventure video games created by David Jones and published by Xbox Game Studios. The series takes place in a futuristic dystopian city controlled and enforced by a law enforcement organization called the Agency. The games center on the Agency's supersoldiers, known as 'Agents', as they fight threats ranging from various criminal syndicates, a terrorist group known as 'Cell', and zombie-like monsters called 'Freaks'.

Games of the series have been developed by various game developers, with the first game, Crackdown, completed by Realtime Worlds on February 20, 2007, and a sequel titled Crackdown 2 developed by Ruffian Games on July 6, 2010. Both games were released for the Xbox 360. A third installment, Crackdown 3 developed by Sumo Digital, was released on February 15, 2019, for the Xbox One and Microsoft Windows. The game has been met with positive critical reception and won several video game awards. Critics praised the sandbox-style third-person shooter for allowing the ability to cause massive destruction in a non-linear gameplay, while also criticizing the series for lacking an actual story. The series has garnered mostly positive reception and commercial success.

Titles

Crackdown

Crackdown was released on February 20, 2007, for the Xbox 360 console. Originally in development for the Xbox console in 2002, Microsoft suggested in 2004 that Realtime Worlds release the game for the then-upcoming Xbox 360. A demo was showcased at the 2006 E3 Convention. Due to the waving interest in player testers during the game's late development, Microsoft decided to release it with access codes to the Halo 3 multiplayer beta to help its sales during release.

The game takes place in Pacific City, a dystopian metropolis that is suffering from an increase in crime rate. Criminal syndicates - namely Los Muertos, The Volk, and The Shai-Gen Corporation - have taken control of its three main territories, and they are armed with military-grade weapons that make it difficult for law enforcement to combat them. A secret organization known as the Agency took it upon themselves to eliminate the city's organized crime using their wide resources and genetically modified human beings called Agents. The Agent successfully brought down each criminal syndicate but it was later found out that it was the Agency itself who supplied the criminals with weapons. They planned for the city to go down in anarchy so that they can step in, stop the criminals, and be hailed heroes when they take over.

Crackdown 2

Although Realtime Worlds confirmed that they would create a series to follow the success of the first Crackdown, delays with budgeting between Microsoft and Realtime resulted in the developer cancelling the sequel. Microsoft however still owned the intellectual property of Crackdown, and they hired fellow Scottish development company Ruffian Games to create the game.  A trailer for Crackdown 2 was released at the 2009 E3 Conference.

The sequel takes place 10 years after the events of the first game. While organized crime has been quelled in Pacific City, a terrorist group calling themselves 'Cell' started a revolt to overthrow the Agency, which has taken control of the city. Cell's leader and former Agency scientist, named Catalina Thorne, released a deadly strain of the "Freak" virus that infected many citizens and turned them into mindless monsters called Freaks. The Agency tried to stop this epidemic by building Project Sunburst, a weapon that used sunlight to destroy Freaks. However, Cell took control of Project Sunburst's generators before the Agency could use the weapon. This forced the Agency to send out their newest and better-equipped Agent to combat both the terrorists and the Freaks. The Agent managed to retake the generators from the Cell, even when he was almost overwhelmed when the previous Agents from the first game found and attacked him. However, when he tried to activate the main beacon, Thorne appeared in a helicopter and tried to destroy it using the turrets. The Agent then sacrificed himself by jumping into the helicopter's blades, severely damaging it and forcing Thorne to retreat. Project Sunburst successfully destroyed all Freaks in Pacific City, and the place was finally safe at last. A post-credit cutscene shows Thorne after surviving the crash, studying the Agent's dismembered hand, which had landed in her helicopter during his sacrifice.

Crackdown 3

A third game was developed by Sumo Digital, with directions from the original game's creator David Jones. The game was revealed as Crackdown 3 during Microsoft's Gamescom 2015 press conference on August 4, 2015. The original reveal showcased the ability for players to destroy the skyscrapers of the game world, and cause them to collapse dynamically. Crackdown 3 takes the series back to its roots of fighting criminal syndicates, with Microsoft Studios' creative director Ken Lobb asserting that the game will be set in the future of the first game but represents an alternate timeline from what Crackdown 2 provided. Previous developer Ruffian Games provided additional assistance for the game's development. The game was originally set to be released for Xbox One and Microsoft Windows on November 7, 2017, but was delayed to 2019. The game was released on February 15, 2019, to mixed reviews.

According to many reviewers, the game did little to change the core gameplay loop from the previous titles and felt like it was the same. Critics of the game were quick to point out that the destructible environments first showcased were nowhere to be seen in the single player, as that aspect of gameplay was turned into a multiplayer mode. Many fans of the series have speculated that the destruction gameplay shown at E3 2015 was changed in the final release due to it interfering with essential gameplay mechanics the series has been notable for. The mechanics in reference are the parkour like traversal system, which plays a major role in combat, as well as the orbs scattered across the game world on top of skyscrapers.

Crackdown 3 added additional traversal mechanics in the game world. Instead of only increasing jump height, agility gave players the ability to have greater control over their aerial movement with the usage of thrusters on the Agency suit. An airdash like movement system was also implemented, making traversal across buildings and the streets of the game world more streamlined compared to previous games. Vehicles were also given an upgrade in gameplay, allowing players to change the form of the Agent's Vehicle into various forms like Lightning (Supercar,) Spider (Buggy/SUV), and Minotaur (Tank, Agency Armored Vehicle) without going to a supply point. The vehicles were also given additional movement options such as a side swipe, and the ability to drive up the walls of buildings. Several abilities were also hidden in the game world such as the wing suit which could be received early on in the game unlike in Crackdown 2 where it was the final reward for agility.

Common elements

Gameplay
With the intent of going beyond the sandbox gameplay made popular by Grand Theft Auto III, developer Realtime Studios spent time with various testers, as well as former developers from the Grand Theft Auto series, in experimenting and refining the genre, with the use of additional content, items and rewards. Creator David Jones described the concept of the game as "how do we reward somebody for just having fun?" In each game, players assume the role of super-powered law enforcers called Agents who protect Pacific City with the use of high-tech vehicles and weapons. Players can choose different races for their Agents, and the sequel added the ability to customize their armor's color. Using a third-person camera, the Agent can dispatch enemies by shooting them with firearms, blowing them up with explosives, or in melee combat.

Being a genetically enhanced human being gives the Agent various skills, namely "Strength" (punching and lifting power), "Agility" (jumping and movement speed), "Driving" (handling vehicles), "Explosives" (creating explosions), and "Firearms" (shooting ability). These skills can be upgraded by collecting specific orbs and killing enemies. Upgrading strength and agility increase the Agent's physicality. While upgrading Driving, Explosives and Weapons unlocks new vehicles and weapons. The Agent is also covered in high-tech armor that has a rechargeable shield that protects him from damage. The armor also evolves as the Agent upgrades his skills, becoming more thick and bulky. Crackdown 2 improved upon this gameplay by allowing the player to unlock new armor abilities, such as a Ground Pound ability that causes powerful shockwaves, a Charge ability, a wingsuit, and thrusters that gives the Agent the ability to glide. The player can also play various minigames such as on-foot and vehicle racing as well as street and aerial stunts.

Multiplayer is also available in every game that uses the same gameplay elements in single-player. The first Crackdown game offered players cooperative gameplay of up to 2 players. The second Crackdown game improved the coop mode to accommodate 4 players while also adding new modes such as Rocket Tag, Vehicle Tag, Capture the Orb, Deathmatch, and Team Deathmatch. Crackdown 3 further expanded the series' coop by allowing over 8 players to participate, as well as being the first to have a fully destructible sandbox environment in multiplayer.

Graphics
The series is known for its artistic use of cel-shading visuals together with its rich color palettes, stylized ambience, and crisp and strong real-time shadows. Developer Realtime Worlds was heavily influenced by comic books in creating the first Crackdown game and they used highlighted ink-like outlines to give it a comic feel. The game was also praised for its use of large draw distances that was seldom seen in other open-world games of its time. Crackdown 2 had a more dilapidated and post-apocalyptic setting but still with the use of the same engine. Ruffian Games used a more advanced crowd system, which allows more NPCs to be in the game while not affecting its play flow. Ruffian further tweaked Crackdowns draw distances by rendering the engine to allow the display of a larger vista of Pacific City.

Music
Each game soundtrack is made up of licensed music from a variety of commercial, independent, and video game musicians. Crackdowns music supervisor Peter Davenport was allowed by Microsoft to select music from any source for the game. Deciding to give it an electronic "dark and ominous" vibe, he selected music from Amon Tobin, Atlas Plug, Celldweller, and Hybrid that he put in each mission and premise. In Crackdown 2, music from Public Enemy, Bob Dylan, Johnny Cash, R.E.M., and Whodini were used to give the game a rebellious feel.

Other media
A webcomic titled the "Pacific City Archives" was also released by Microsoft to accompany the worldwide release of Crackdown 2. Containing over 5 episodes, the webcomic series bridged the gap between the first and second Crackdown games by expanding character backstory and game lore. The Agent is also an unlockable character in the Xbox Live Arcade game Perfect Dark.

Reception and legacy
The first game was both a critical and commercial success, becoming the top-selling game of February 22, 2007, during its first release week in North America, Japan, and the UK. The game was the top-selling game in North America for the month of February 2007, selling 427,000 units. Ultimately, by the end of 2007, the game sold 1.5 million copies worldwide. The game also won numerous awards such as the "Best Action and Adventure Game" and "Best Use of Audio" in the 2007 BAFTA, "Best Debut" award at the 2008 Game Developers Choice Awards, and the Innovation Award at the 2007 Develop Magazine Awards. Game Informer listed it as one of the top 50 games of 2007, citing its unique experience and several other elements, as well as listing the Agents as the number eight "Top heroes of 2007" and listing climbing the tallest building in the city as the number nine "Top Moment of 2007." Various video game websites considered the Crackdown series as one of the best open-world video games to date. The Escapist included it in its "8 Awesome Open World Games" list, stating that "open world games have improved a lot since then, but Crackdown is still a stellar example of the genre." Game Journalist Callum from Pixel Bedlam dubbed Crackdown as one of the most underrated video games of all time, adding also that the game was "more than just a Grand Theft Auto clone on steroids."

The second game also received positive reception in its release, although many critics pointed that it was too similar to its predecessor. While the game was inherently good, it was ranked by many to be one of the most disappointing sequels of its generation. Jim Sterling, during their time at Destructoid, reviewed the game and called it "the most pointless, unnecessary, and insulting "sequels" ever created."

The games left a large impact on the open-world genre. James Hunt of Den of Geek described the first Crackdown game as "the first in a line of original, postmodern superhero creations on games consoles, and great fun to boot." Its formula of controlling super-powered beings in a massive sandbox environment, and using their abilities to cause mayhem and destruction have influenced other video game series such as Infamous, Prototype, Saints Row, The Saboteur, and Just Cause 2. Game creator Brian Fleming was influenced by the climbing and parkour aspects of the first Crackdown in designing the gameplay for Infamous. The series' mainstay gameplay of collecting orbs in an open world environment to increase a character's abilities, was also copied by another similar game called Prototype. Keiichiro Toyama cited Crackdown as a big influence in developing his award-winning game Gravity Rush, stating that he "really liked the aspect of unlocking skills and becoming more powerful, and achieving a higher level of freedom as you become more powerful".

References

 
Microsoft franchises
Video game franchises
Video game franchises introduced in 2007
Third-person shooters
Video games adapted into comics
Action-adventure games
Open-world video games
Parkour video games
Dystopian video games
Post-apocalyptic video games
Superhero video games
Video games with cel-shaded animation
Biopunk
Cyberpunk video games